Contigo sí (English title: You Are the One) is a Mexican telenovela that aired on Las Estrellas from 11 October 2021 to 25 March 2022. The series is produced by Ignacio Sada. It is based on the 1978 Mexican telenovela Viviana created by Inés Rodena. The series stars Alejandra Robles Gil, Danilo Carrera, and Brandon Peniche.

Plot 
Ángela (Alejandra Robles Gil) is a nurse and medical student who lives in a town near the sea. She is seduced by Álvaro (Danilo Carrera), an ambitious young man who visits the town on a business trip to build a hospital. Ángela and Álvaro get married but then he abandons her and returns to Mexico City, where he is engaged to Samantha (Bárbara Islas) and marries her as well. Ángela decides to go to Mexico City in search of Álvaro, she discovers the deception and meets Leonardo (Brandon Peniche), a doctor who falls in love with her and becomes her protector. Ángela will tirelessly fight against the adversities of destiny, in the quest to find true love.

Cast

Main 
 Alejandra Robles Gil as Ángela Gutiérrez
 Lara Campos as Child Ángela
 Danilo Carrera as Álvaro Villalobos Hurtado
 Brandon Peniche as Leonardo Santillana Morán
 Ernesto Laguardia as Gerardo Vega
 Bárbara Islas as Samantha Vega
 Anette Michel as Mirta Morán
 Áxel Ricco as Félix
 Gema Garoa as Alma Yazbek
 Francisco Rubio as Darío
 Tania Lizardo as Luz
 Carina Ricco as Beatriz Guardiola
 Emoé de la Parra as Doña Pura
 Felipe Nájera as Julio Vallejo
 Daniela Zavala as Adela
 Lisardo as Aníbal Treviño
 Alejandra Procuna as Yolanda
 Arlette Pacheco as Fedra
 Rebeca Mankita as Josefina
 Silvia Lomelí as Nancy
 Claudia Ortega as Nélida
 Carlos Speitzer as Abel
 Lalo Palacios as Pablo
 Nacho Ortiz Vera as Óscar
 Miranda Kay as Clarita
 Emilio Palacios as Eddie
 Kenneth Lavíll as Memo
 Manuel Landeta as Sandro Santillana

Recurring 
 Pepe Olivares as Ugarte
 Gregorio Reséndiz as Judge Lorca
 Benjamín Rivero as Baldomero
 Salvador Ibarra as Benjamín
 Rafael Amador as Father Marcos
 Paulina de Labra as Pasiflora
 José Montini as Legaspi
 Esteban Franco as Gabino
 Martín Brek as Fulgencio
 Roberto Tello as El Chamuco
 Carlos Athié as Francisco

Guest stars 
 Pedro Moreno as Josué
 María Prado as Conchita

Production 
In June 2021, it was reported that Ignacio Sada was producing a new version of the 1978 telenovela Viviana, with the working title being Volverte a ver. On 12 July 2021, Alejandra Robles Gil, Danilo Carrera, and Brandon Peniche were announced in the lead roles. Filming began on 26 July 2021. On 19 August 2021, it was announced that the official title of the telenovela would be Contigo sí. Filming concluded on 12 February 2022.

Ratings

Episodes

Notes

References

External links 
 

2021 telenovelas
2021 Mexican television series debuts
2022 Mexican television series endings
2020s Mexican television series
Televisa telenovelas
Mexican telenovelas
Spanish-language telenovelas
2020s LGBT-related drama television series
Mexican LGBT-related television shows